Yuval Ben-Itzhak is an executive and entrepreneur. He received a number of honors and public recognition for his work as a Chief Technology Officer throughout his career. Ben-Itzhak has been selected as the 25 most influencing CTO by InfoWorld, 40 Innovative IT People To Watch by Computerworld, and 2017 Chief Technology Officer of the Year by GeekTime. He was the Chief Technology Officer at AVG and was part of the leadership team that took AVG through its initial public offering on the New York Stock Exchange in 2012.   He was the Chief Technology Officer at Outbrain until 2017, and led the acquisition of Socialbakers by Astute in 2020 as the Chief Executive Officer. Yuval is the inventor of 26 US Patents.

Career

 2017–2020: Chief Executive Officer, Socialbakers
 2015–2017: Chief Technology Officer, Outbrain
 2009–2015: Chief Technology Officer, AVG Technologies (NYSE: AVG)
 2005–2009: Chief Technology Officer, Finjan Inc.
 2000–2004: Chief Technology Officer, Founder, KaVaDo Inc.
 1998–2000: Chief Technology Officer, Ness Technologies (Nasdaq: NSTC)
 1994–1996: Software development & management, Intel Corp. (Nasdaq: INTC)
 1988–1992: Intelligence services, IDF

Awards 
 2017 – Chief Technology Officer of the Year by GeekTime
 2007 – 40 Innovative IT People To Watch by Computerworld
 2004 – Top 25 Most Influential CTOs by InfoWorld

References 

Living people
Israeli businesspeople
Chief technology officers
Ben-Gurion University of the Negev alumni
Year of birth missing (living people)